The Hibbert Lectures are an annual series of non-sectarian lectures on theological issues. They are sponsored by the Hibbert Trust, which was founded in 1847 by the Unitarian Robert Hibbert with a goal to uphold "the unfettered exercise of private judgement in matters of religion.". In recent years the lectures have been broadcast by the BBC.

Lecturers (incomplete list)

1878-1894 (First Series)
1878 Max Müller On the Religions of India (inaugural)
1879 Peter le Page Renouf The Religion of the Egyptians
1880 Ernest Renan Lectures on the Influence of the Institutions, Thought And Culture of Rome on Christianity And the Development of the Catholic Church
1881 T. W. Rhys Davids Indian Buddhism
1882 Abraham Kuenen National Religions and Universal Religion
1883 Charles Beard The Reformation of the Sixteenth Century in its Relation to Modern Thought and Knowledge
1884 Albert Reville The Native Religions of Mexico and Peru
1885 Otto Pfleiderer The Influence of the Apostle Paul on the Development of Christianity
1886 John Rhys Lectures on the origin and growth of religion as illustrated by Celtic heathendom
1887 Archibald Sayce Lectures on the Origin and Growth of Religion as illustrated by the Religion of the Ancient Babylonians
1888 Edwin Hatch Influence of Greek Ideas and Usages Upon the Christian Church
1891 Eugene, Count Goblet D'Alviella Lectures on the Origin and Growth of the Concept of God, as Illustrated by Anthropology and History  
1892 Claude Montefiore The Origin and Growth of Religion as Illustrated by the Religion of the Ancient Hebrews
1893 Charles Barnes Upton Lectures on the bases of religious belief
1894 James Drummond Via, Veritas, Vita; Christianity in its most simple and intelligible form

1900-1949
1906 Franz Cumont (on Oriental Religions in Roman Paganism)
1908 William James A Pluralistic Universe
1911 Lewis Richard Farnell The Higher Aspects of Greek Religion
1912 James Hope Moulton Early Zoroastrianism
1913 Josiah Royce The Problem of Christianity, online edition (volume one)
1913 David Samuel Margoliouth The Early Development of Mohammedanism
1914 Herbert A. Giles Confucianism and Its Rivals
1916 Louis de La Vallée-Poussin The Way to Nirvána: Ancient Buddhism as a Discipline of Salvation
1916 Philip H. Wicksteed The reactions between dogma & philosophy illustrated from the works of S. Thomas Aquinas
1919 Joseph Estlin Carpenter Theism in Medieval India 
1920 William Ralph Inge "The State, Visible and Invisible"
1921 James Moffatt The Approach to the New Testament
1922 Lawrence Pearsall Jacks Religious Perplexities
1923 Felix Adler The Reconstruction of the Spiritual Ideal
1924 Lawrence Pearsall Jacks Human consciousness towards God
1925 Francis Greenwood Peabody
1929 Sarvepalli Radhakrishnan An Idealist View of Life
1930 Rabindranath Tagore The Religion of Man
1931 George Dawes Hicks The Philosophical Bases of Theism 
1932 Robert Seymour Conway Ancient Italy and Modern Religion
1933 Lawrence Pearsall Jacks The Revolt Against Mechanism
1934 Albert Schweitzer Religion in Modern Civilization
1936 William Ernest Hocking Living Religions and a World Faith
1937 Gilbert Murray Liberality and Civilisation

1950-1999
1959 Basil Willey Darwin And Butler: Two Versions of Evolution
1963 James Luther Adams
1964 Geoffrey Nuttall, Roger Thomas, Roy Drummond Whitehorn, Harry Lismer Short, The Beginnings of Nonconformity
1965 Frederick Hadaway Hilliard Christianity in education
1977 Jonathon Porritt, Bringing Religion Down to Earth
1979 Rustum Roy Experimenting with Truth
1989 Bede Griffiths, Christianity in the Light of the East

2000-
2003 James L. Cox Religion without God: Methodological Agnosticism and the Future of Religious Studies
2005 Karen Armstrong and Khalid Hameed Spirituality and global citizenship

Notes

British lecture series
Religious education in the United Kingdom
Unitarianism